Ruth Iouliani (Juliana) Macrides (1949 – 27 April 2019) was a UK-based historian of the Byzantine Empire. At the time of her death, she was Reader in Byzantine Studies at the Centre for Byzantine, Ottoman and Greek Studies at the University of Birmingham. She was an expert in Byzantine history, culture and politics, particularly of the mid-later Byzantine period, and of the reception of Byzantium in Britain and Greece.

Education and career 
Macrides received her B.A. in Classics from Columbia University in 1971. She was a Junior Fellow at Dumbarton Oaks Research Library and Collection, 1975–1976.

Macrides was awarded a PhD at King's College, London, in 1978 for a thesis entitled A translation and historical commentary of George Akropolites' History. Akropolites' History was the major Greek source for the Latin occupation of Constantinople in the thirteenth century. Macrides' doctoral supervisor was Donald Nicol. Macrides published her translation in 2007.

Macrides was lecturer in Medieval History at the University of St Andrews between 1978 and 1998. She joined the University of Birmingham in 1994, initially sharing a position with her long-time colleague, friend and one-time housemate Leslie Brubaker. She was appointed to a full-time post at Birmingham in 2000. In 2013, she was promoted to Reader in Byzantine Studies at Birmingham.

With Peter Mackridge, Macrides was editor of the prominent journal Byzantine and Greek Studies. Upon her unexpected death, her predecessor as editor, Professor John Haldon of Princeton, temporarily resumed the editorship. She was convenor of the weekly General Seminar of the Centre for Byzantine, Ottoman and Modern Greek Studies at Birmingham.

Awards and honours 
Macrides was a Senior Fellow at Dumbarton Oaks Research Library and Collection. She also held a fellowship at Dumbarton Oaks between January and May 2010, carrying out a project called 'Imperial Ceremonial in Palaiologan Constantinople'. She was a Committee Member for the Society, Arts, and Letters of the British School at Athens. At the time of her death, she was preparing a project on Byzantine co-emperors, to be carried out during a visiting fellowship (a 'Membership') at the School of Historical Studies at Princeton University in the academic year 2019/20.

Death 
Macrides died suddenly in Dundee, Scotland on 27 April 2019, as a result of a brain hemorrhage. A tribute page was created by the University of Birmingham, with contributions from Macrides' friends, colleagues and students. A Greek Orthodox funeral service for Macrides took place on Tuesday 14 May 2019 at St. Leonard's Chapel, St. Andrews, Scotland.

Bibliography 

 edited with J.A. Munitiz and Dimiter Angelov Pseudo-Kodinos, the Constantinopolitan Court, Offices and Ceremonies (Ashgate 2013)
History as Literature in Byzantium (Farnham 2010).
George Akropolites The History (Oxford 2007)
Travel in the Byzantine World (Aldershot 2002)
Kinship and Justice in Byzantium, 11th-15th centuries (Aldershot 1999)
 ‘Emperor and Church in the Last Centuries of Byzantium’, Studies in Church History 54 (2018) pp. 123–43.
 ‘Ceremonies and the city: the court in fourteenth-century Constantinople’, Royal courts in dynastic states and empires: a global perspective, eds. J. Duindam, T. Artan, M. Kunt (Leiden 2011) 217–35.
 ‘The citadel of Byzantine Constantinople’, Cities and citadels in Turkey from the Iron Age to the Seljuks, eds. S. Redford and N. Ergin (Louvain, 2013) 277–304.
 ‘Trial by ordeal in Byzantium: on whose authority?’, Authority in Byzantium, ed. P. Armstrong (Farnham 2013) 31–46.
 '"The reason is not known". Remembering and recording the past. Pseudo-Kodinos as a historian', in P. Odorico, P.A. Agapitos, M. Hinterberger (eds), L'écriture de la mémoire. La littérarité de l'histographie (Paris 2006) 317 - 330
 'The law outside the lawbooks: law and literature', Fontes Minores XI (2005) 133-145
 '1204: The Greek Sources' in A. Laiou (ed) Urbs capta: The fourth Crusade and its consequences; la quatrième croisade et ses conséquences  (Paris 2005), 143- 152
 'The ritual of petition', in P. Roilos and D. Yatromanolakis, eds., Greek Ritual Poetics (Cambridge, Mass. 2004), pp. 356–70
 'The thirteenth century in Byzantine historical writing', in Ch. Dendrinos, J. Harris, E. Harvalia-Crook, J. Herrin, eds., Porphyrogenita: Essays in honour of Julian Chrysostomides (London 2003), 63–76.
 'George Akropolites' rhetoric', Rhetoric in Byzantium, edited by Elizabeth Jeffreys (Aldershot 2003), pp. 201–111.
 'Constantinople: the crusaders' gaze', in R. Macrides, ed., Travel in the Byzantine World (Aldershot 2002), 193–212.
 'Substitute parents and their children', in M. Corbier, ed., Adoption et fosterage (Paris 2000), 307–319.
 'The pen and the sword: who wrote the Alexiad?', in Th. Gouma-Peterson, ed., Anna Komnene and her times (New York 2000), 63–81.
 ‘”As Byzantine then as it is today”: Pope Joan and Roidis’ Greece’, in D. Ricks and P. Magdalino, eds., Byzantium and the Modern Greek Identity (Aldershot 1998) 73-86
 ‘From the Komnenoi to the Palaiologoi: imperial models in decline and exile’, in P. Magdalino, ed., New Constantines (Aldershot 1992) 269-282
 ‘Dynastic marriages and political kinship’, in J. Shepard and S. Franklin, eds., Byzantine diplomacy (Aldershot 1992) 380-410
 ‘Subversion and loyalty in the cult of St Demetrios’, Byzantinoslavica 51 (1990) 189-197
 ‘The Byzantine godfather’, Byzantine and Modern Greek Studies 11 (1987) 139-162
 ‘Saints and sainthood in the early Palaiologan period’, in S. Hackel, ed., The Byzantine Saint (London 1981) 67-8

External links
 https://www.birmingham.ac.uk/staff/profiles/bomg/macrides-ruth.aspx
 http://www.crusaderstudies.org.uk/resources/historians/profiles/macrides/index.html
https://ics.sas.ac.uk/events/event/19436
https://www.doaks.org/research/support-for-research/fellowships/reports/2009-2010/macrides
https://brill.com/view/book/edcoll/9789004206236/Bej.9789004206229.i-444_011.xml?crawler=true
https://bizantinistica.blogspot.com/2019/04/fallecimiento-de-ruth-macrides.html
https://kclpure.kcl.ac.uk/portal/files/2932523/DX187399.pdf

References

1949 births
2019 deaths
Women classical scholars
British Byzantinists
Women historians
Historians of antiquity
Academics of the University of Birmingham
Alumni of King's College London
Columbia College (New York) alumni
Scholars of Byzantine literature
Women Byzantinists
Women medievalists